Lecithocera ambona is a moth in the family Lecithoceridae. It was described by Chun-Sheng Wu and You-Qiao Liu in 1993. It is found in Sichuan, China.

The wingspan is about 15 mm. The species resembles Lecithocera mazina, but the forewings of this species have no pattern.

References

Moths described in 1993
ambona